The Berbinceni gas field is a natural gas field located in Secuieni, Bacău County. It was discovered in 2008 and developed by and Romgaz.  It began production in 2008 and produces natural gas and condensates. The total proven reserves of the Berbinceni gas field are around 53 billion cubic feet (1.5 km³), and production is slated to be around 7 million cubic feet/day (0.2×105m³) in 2010.

References

Natural gas fields in Romania